The 8th Lok Sabha ran from 31 December 1984 to 27 November 1989. Politicians were elected in December 1984, taking office by the end of the month. The Lok Sabha (House of the People) is the lower house in the bicameral Parliament of India. 9 sitting members from Rajya Sabha were elected to 8th Lok Sabha after the Indian general election, in 1984.

Rajiv Gandhi of Indian National Congress continued as Prime Minister till 2 December 1989. In this 8th Lok Sabha, INC party had 30 more seats than previous 7th Lok Sabha.

The next 9th Lok Sabha was formed on 2 December 1989, after the 1989 Indian general election.

Important members 
 Speaker:
Balram Jakhar from 16 January 1985 to 18 December 1989
 Deputy Speaker:
M. Thambi Durai from 22 January 1985 to 27 November 1989
Secretary General:
Subhash C Kashyap from 31 December 1983 to 20 August 1990

List of members by political party

Members of the political party in 8th Lok Sabha are given below:

References

External links

 Lok Sabha website

 Terms of the Lok Sabha
India MPs 1984–1989
1984 establishments in India
1989 disestablishments in India